These are the results of the Men's lightweight double sculls competition in Rowing at the 2004 Summer Olympics in Athens Greece. It was one of eight events in men's rowing that was held.

Medalists

Heats - 15 August

SF denotes qualification to semifinal
R denotes qualification to repechage

Heat 1

Heat 2

Heat 3

Heat 4

Repechages - 17 August

Repechage 1
: Kazushige Ura and Daisaku Takeda 6:17.26 -> Semifinal A/B
: Steve Tucker and Greg Ruckman 6:19.35 -> Semifinal A/B
: Manuel Brehmer and Ingo Euler 6:21.57 -> Semifinal C/D
: Armando Arrechavaleta Carrera and Yosvel Iglesias Montano 6:27.89 -> Semifinal C/D

Repechage 2
: Tomasz Kucharski and Robert Sycz 6:20.90 -> Semifinal A/B
: Ruben Alvarez Hoyos and Juan Zunzunegui Guimerans 6:26.66 -> Semifinal A/B
: Rodolfo Collazo and Joe Reboledo Pineyrua 6:30.23 -> Semifinal C/D
: Zhu Zhifu and Yang Jian 6:31.87 -> Semifinal C/D

Repechage 3
: Zsolt Hirling and Tamás Varga 6:22.63 -> Semifinal A/B
: Lubos Podstupka and Lukáš Babač 6:25.75 -> Semifinal A/B
: Justin Gevaert and Wouter van der Fraenen 6:31.18 -> Semifinal C/D
: Sergey Bogdanov and Ruslan Naurzaliev 6:45.69 -> Semifinal C/D

Repechage 4
: Václav Maleček and Michal Vabroušek 6:19.04 -> Semifinal A/B
: Elia Luini and Leonardo Pettinari 6:21.22 -> Semifinal A/B
: George Jelbart and Cameron Wurf 6:26.10 -> Semifinal C/D
: Thiago Gomes and Jose Sobral, Jr. 6:33.66 -> Semifinal C/D
: Ting Wai Lo and Sau Wah So 6:41.09 -> Semifinal C/D

Semifinals - 19 August

Semifinal A
: Tomasz Kucharski and Robert Sycz 6:14.91 -> Final A
: Vasileios Polymeros and Nikolaos Skiathitis 6:17.12 -> Final A
: Mads Rasmussen and Rasmus Quist Hansen 6:17.85 -> Final A
: Steve Tucker and Greg Ruckman 6:21.46 -> Final B
: Václav Maleček and Michal Vabroušek 6:23.17 -> Final B
: Luboš Podstupka and Lukáš Babač 6:29.44 -> Final B

Semifinal B
: Frédéric Dufour and Pascal Touron 6:16.33 -> Final A
: Zsolt Hirling and Tamás Varga 6:18.23 -> Final A
: Kazushige Ura and Daisaku Takeda 6:18.51 -> Final A
: Sam Lynch and Gearoid Towey 6:19.09 -> Final B
: Elia Luini and Leonardo Pettinari 6:23.72 -> Final B
: Ruben Alvarez Hoyos and Juan Zunzunegui Guimerans 6:30.15 -> Final B

Semifinal C
: Manuel Brehmer and Ingo Euler 6:23.22 -> Final C
: Justin Gevaert and Wouter van der Fraenen 6:25.34 -> Final C
: Zhu Zhifu and Yang Jian 6:25.97 -> Final C
: Thiago Gomes and Jose Sobral, Jr. 6:26.98

Semifinal D
: George Jelbart and Cameron Wurf 6:27.68 -> Final C
: Armando Arrechavaleta Carrera and Yosvel Iglesias Montano 6:28.09 -> Final C
: Rodolfo Collazo and Joe Reboledo Pineyrua 6:29.39 -> Final C
: Lo Ting Wai and So Sau Wah 6:37.03
: Sergey Bogdanov and Ruslan Naurzaliev 6:45.47

Finals

Final A - 22 August
: Tomasz Kucharski and Robert Sycz 6:20.93
: Frédéric Dufour and Pascal Touron 6:21.46
: Vasileios Polymeros and Nikolaos Skiathitis 6:23.23
: Mads Rasmussen and Rasmus Quist Hansen 6:23.92
: Zsolt Hirling and Tamás Varga 6:24.69
: Kazushige Ura and Daisaku Takeda 6:24.98

Final B - 21 August
: Steve Tucker and Greg Ruckman 6:45.20
: Ruben Alvarez Hoyos and Juan Zunzunegui Guimerans 6:46.48
: Václav Maleček and Michal Vabroušek 6:46.77
: Sam Lynch and Gearoid Towey 6:49.26
: Lubos Podstupka and Lukáš Babač 6:58.78
: Elia Luini and Leonardo Pettinari 7:01.86

Final C - 21 August
: Manuel Brehmer and Ingo Euler 6:45.62
: Armando Arrechavaleta Carrera and Yosvel Iglesias Montano 6:48.50
: Justin Gevaert and Wouter van der Fraenen 6:50.07
: George Jelbart and Cameron Wurf 6:51.32
: Zhu Zhifu and Yang Jian 6:58.88
: Rodolfo Collazo and Joe Reboledo Pineyrua 7:03.72

References

External links
Official Olympic Report

Men's Lwt Double Sculls
Men's events at the 2004 Summer Olympics